Western States Book Award honored notable works of fiction, creative nonfiction, poetry, and translation written and published in the Western United States. The award was given annually from 1984 until 2002. Lifetime-achievement awards were also presented.

Winners

Fiction
1984: The iguana killer: twelve stories of the heart by Alberto Rios
1986: My amputations: a novel by Clarence Major
1988: Sailing to Corinth: stories by Irene Wanner
1990: The devil in Texas (El Diablo en Texas) by Aristeo Brito
1992: Little altars everywhere: a novel by Rebecca Wells
1993: The hedge, the ribbon: a novel by Carol Orlock
1994: MotherTongue by Demetria Martinez
1996: A killing in New Town by Kate Horsley
1998: The flower in the skull by Kathleen Alcalá
1999: The blossom festival by Lawrence Coates
1999: Men on the moon: collected short stories by Simon Ortiz
2000: Straight white male by Gerald Haslam
2001: The road builder by Nicholas Hershenow

Poetry
1984: In all the rooms of the yellow house by Nancy Mairs
1984: New as a wave: a retrospective, 1937-1983 by Eve Triem
1986: Time and the white tigress by Mary Barnard
1988: Desire: selected poems, 1963-1987 by David Bromige
1990: New poems, 1980-88 by John Haines
1992: My name is William Tell: poems by William Stafford
1993: August zero by Jane Miller
1994: The fever of being by Luis Alberto Urrea
1995: My town by David Lee
1996: Flying over Sonny Liston: poems by Gary Short
1998: Four-year-old-girl by Mei-Mei Berssenbrugge
1999: Communion by Primus St. John
2000: The brink by Peter Sears
2001: Bitters by Rebecca Seiferle
2001: Cool, calm, & collected: poems 1960-2000 by Carolyn Kizer

Creative nonfiction
1984: A heaven in the eye by Clyde Rice
1986: The seventh dragon: the riddle of equal temperament by Anita Sullivan
 (citation for merit) Having everything right: essays of place by Kim R. Stafford
1988: Mayordomo: chronicle of an acequia in northern New Mexico by Stanley Crawford
1990: The telling distance: conversations with the American desert by Bruce Berger
1992: Going back to Bisbee by Richard Shelton
 (citation for merit) Fruit fields in my blood: Okie migrants in the West by Toby F. Sonneman
1993: Two old women: an Alaska legend of betrayal, courage, and survival by Velma Wallis
1994: Iron house: stories from the yard by Jerome Washington
1995: Borneo log: the struggle for Sarawak's forests by William Bevis
1995: Downcanyon: a naturalist explores the Colorado River through the Grand Canyon by Ann Haymond Zwinger
1996: Wisdom sits in places: language and landscape among the Western Apache by Keith Basso
1998: Chokecherry places: essays from the high plains by Merrill Gilfillan
1999: Salt dreams: land & water in low-down California by William Debuys
2000: In these hills by Ralph Beer
2001: My story as told by water: confessions, Druidic rants, reflections, bird-watchings, fish-stalkings, visions, songs and prayers refracting light, from living rivers, in the age of the industrial dark by David James Duncan

Translation
2000: The collected songs of Cold Mountain by Hanshan; translated from the Chinese by Red Pine
2001: The silk dragon: translations from the Chinese translated by Arthur Sze

Lifetime Achievement
1984: Eve Triem in poetry
1990: John Hainesin poetry
1992: William Stafford in poetry
1999: Simon Ortiz in fiction
2001: Carolyn Kizer in poetry

See also
Western States Arts Federation

References

American literary awards
Awards established in 1984
1984 establishments in the United States
Awards disestablished in 2002
2002 disestablishments in the United States